Parsabad (also Romanized as Pârsâbâd), also known as Parsabad-Moghan, is a city in the Central District of Parsabad County of Ardabil province, Iran, and serves as capital of the county. At the 2006 census, its population was 81,782 in 17,638 households. The following census in 2011 counted 88,924 people in 23,045 households. The latest census in 2016 showed a population of 93,387 people in 26,505 households.
Parsabad is Iran's northernmost city.

Climate
Parsabad has a cold semi-arid climate (BSk).

References 

Parsabad County

Cities in Ardabil Province

Towns and villages in Parsabad County

Populated places in Ardabil Province

Populated places in Parsabad County